Sheahan Bridge is a dual carriageway bridge over the Murrumbidgee River on the Hume Highway in Gundagai, New South Wales.

History

Northbound bridge
Sheahan Bridge was built by Transbridge in 1977 to replace the Prince Alfred Bridge over the Murrumbidgee River and as part of a  deviation of the Hume Highway built to bypass Gundagai. It was constructed using steel-box girder with a single lane of traffic in each direction. It was officially opened to traffic by the Premier of New South Wales, Neville Wran on 25 March 1977.

The bridge was named after local politician Bill Sheahan, who had held the seat of Burrinjuck in the New South Wales Legislative Assembly. It has three spans over the main river channel and a further 24 south of the river, forming a viaduct over its flood-plain. At the time of completion, it was the second longest bridge in New South Wales and the longest bridge built by the Department of Main Roads.

Originally having one lane in each direction, since the opening of a parallel second bridge in 2009, it has carried northbound traffic in both lanes. Prior to 2021, Higher Productivity Vehicles had been unable to use the bridge, due to the design capabilities and the standards used in 1977. Since March 2021, Higher Productivity Vehicles have been allowed to use the northbound bridge under permit.

Southbound bridge
The bridge was duplicated with a new bridge built immediately to the east of the existing structure by Fulton Hogan in 2008/09. The new bridge was officially opened to traffic by Minister for Infrastructure and Transport, Anthony Albanese on 25 May 2009. Duplication of the bridge had been planned since 1995. It initially carried traffic in both directions while the 1977 built bridge was refurbished. From December 2009, it carried southbound traffic only.

See also 

 List of bridges in Australia

Reference

External links

Box girder bridges
Bridges completed in 1977
Bridges in New South Wales
Gundagai
Hume Highway
1977 establishments in Australia